Morocco competed at the 1984 Summer Olympics in Los Angeles, United States.  The nation returned to the Summer Games after participating in the American-led boycott of the 1980 Summer Olympics. 34 competitors, 33 men and 1 woman, took part in 18 events in 6 sports.

Medalists

Athletics

Men's 1,500 metres
 Faouzi Lahbi
 Qualifying Heat — 3:47.54 (→ did not advance)

Men's 5,000 metres 
 Saïd Aouita 
 Heat — 13:45.66
 Semifinals — 13:28.39 
 Final — 13:05.59 (→   Gold Medal)

Women's 400m Hurdles 
 Nawal El Moutawakel 
 Heat — 56.49 
 Semifinal — 55.65
 Final — 54.61 (→   Gold Medal)

Boxing

Men's Light Flyweight (– 48 kg)
 Mahjoub Mjirich
 First Round — Lost to Agapito Gómez (Spain), on points (2:3)

Cycling

Four cyclists represented Morocco in 1984.

Individual road race
 Mustapha Najjari – +22:30 (→ 54th place) 
 Mustapha Afandi – did not finish (→ no ranking) 
 Brahim Ben Bouilla – did not finish (→ no ranking) 
 Ahmed Rhail – did not finish (→ no ranking)

Football

Men's Team Competition
 Preliminary Round (Group C)
 Morocco – West Germany 0 – 2
 Morocco – Saudi Arabia 1 – 0
 Morocco – Brazil 0 – 2
 Quarter Finals
 → Did not advance

Team Roster:
 ( 1.) Ezaki Badou
 ( 2.) Saad Dahan
 ( 3.) Abdelmajid Lands
 ( 4.) Mostafa Elbiyaz
 ( 5.) Noureddine Bouyahiaoui
 ( 6.) Abdelmajid Dolmy 
 ( 7.) Mustapha Elhadaoui
 ( 8.) Driss Mouttaqui 
 ( 9.) Hassan Hanini
 (10.) Mohammed Timoumi 
 (11.) Khalid Elbied
 (12.) Salaheddine Hmied
 (13.) Mustapha Merry
 (14.) Mohamed Safri
 (15.) Lahcen Ouadani
 (16.) Hamid Janina
 (17.) Abdeslam Elghrissi

Judo

Wrestling

References

External links
Official Olympic Reports
International Olympic Committee results database

Nations at the 1984 Summer Olympics
1984
1984 in Moroccan sport